Sainte-Aurélie is a municipality in the Les Etchemins Regional County Municipality in the Chaudière-Appalaches region of Quebec, Canada. Its population is 856 as of the Canada 2021 Census. It is named after Sister Sainte-Aurélie, an Ursuline nun at the end of the 19th century.

Sainte-Aurélie has a small border crossing to the United States of America, Ste. Aurelie Station.

History
Sainte-Aurélie was founded by a Frenchman named Victor Vanier in 1909. It was originally known as Metgermette-Nord and was created by separating from what would become Saint-Zacharie. It would be in 1932 that Metgermette-Nord would take its current name of Sainte-Aurélie

References

Commission de toponymie du Québec
Ministère des Affaires municipales, des Régions et de l'Occupation du territoire
Canada Border Services Agency

Incorporated places in Chaudière-Appalaches
Municipalities in Quebec